Berberis piperiana is a shrub native to the mountains of northern California and southwestern Oregon.

Leaves are evergreen, pinnately compound with 5-9 leaflets. Berries are dark blue and waxy. The species is related to the more common Oregon-grape, B. aquifolium, but distinguished by its shorter stature and broader leaflets.

The compound leaves place this species in the group sometimes segregated as the genus Mahonia.

References

piperiana
Flora of California
Flora of Oregon
Flora of the Klamath Mountains
Endemic flora of the United States
Flora without expected TNC conservation status